Wurdong Heights is a rural locality in the Gladstone Region, Queensland, Australia. In the  Wurdong Heights had a population of 462 people.

Geography 
The Bruce Highway forms the southern boundary of the locality. The Gladstone–Benaraby Road runs through from north to south. The North Coast railway line traverses the locality entering from the south and exiting to the north-east, but there are no railway stations within the locality.

The Boyne River forms part of the south-eastern boundary of the locality as it heads towards the Coral Sea.

History 
In the  Wurdong Heights had a population of 462 people.

References 

Gladstone Region
Localities in Queensland